The 1985 Donnay Indoor Championships was a men's tennis tournament played on indoor carpet courts at the Forest National in Brussels, Belgium the event was part of the 1985 Nabisco Grand Prix. It was the fifth edition of the tournament and was held from 11 March until 17 March 1985. Second-seeded Anders Järryd won the singles title.

Prize money

*per team

Finals

Singles

 Anders Järryd defeated  Mats Wilander, 6–4, 3–6, 7–5
 It was Järryd's 1st singles title of the year and the 5th of his career.

Doubles

 Stefan Edberg /  Anders Järryd defeated  Kevin Curren /  Wojciech Fibak, 6–3, 7–6

References

Donnay Indoor Championships
Donnay
+